A constitutional referendum about the reduction of the size of the Italian Parliament was held in Italy on 20 and 21 September 2020. Initially scheduled to be held on 29 March, the referendum was postponed following the spread of the coronavirus pandemic in Italy and subsequent lockdown.

Voters were asked whether they approved a constitutional law that would amend the Italian Constitution in various aspects, most notably by reducing the number of MPs in the Parliament from 630 to 400 in the Chamber of Deputies and from 315 to 200 in the Senate. The proposed changes were approved, with 69.96% voting in favour. The reduction in the number of MPs happened at the 2022 Italian general election on 25 September 2022.

This was the second time in Italian history a constitutional referendum was successful, with the 2001 referendum being the first. Two previous constitutional reforms had been rejected by referendums in 2006 and 2016.

Political background
In 2016, the Democratic-led (PD) coalition government proposed a series of constitutional reforms with the aim of reducing the total number of parliamentarians, simplifying the legislative process, limiting the operating costs of the institutions, the disestablishment of the National Council for Economics and Labour (CNEL), and removing the perfect bicameralism in particular by greatly reducing the size and scope of the Senate. The proposal was rejected by 59% of voters through a constitutional referendum, prompting the resignation of the Prime Minister, Matteo Renzi.

In 2019, the PD-Five Star Movement (M5S) coalition government proposed new constitutional reforms which simply called for the reduction of the number of parliamentarians by a third; the bill was approved with the support of all the major political parties on 8 October 2019. The proposal was one of the Five Star Movement's main campaign promises during the 2018 general election, aimed at reducing the costs of politics and slashing privileges for lawmakers. The total reduction in costs was estimated at between 285 and 500 million euros per five-year parliamentary term. The reform was also part of the coalition deal between the PD and M5S. However, critics argued that the savings would be far too small to warrant a reduction in the number of lawmakers, which they believed would decrease democratic representation by lowering the number of lawmakers per 100,000 inhabitants to 1.6 from 1. In comparison, Germany had 0.9:1 ratio, France had a 1.4:1 ratio, and the United Kingdom had a 2.1:1 ratio.

Proposed changes

The proposed constitutional law would amend Article 56 of the Constitution by reducing the number of deputies from 630, twelve of which are elected in the overseas constituencies, to 400, with eight to be elected in the overseas constituencies. According to Paragraph 3 of the Article, the subdivision of seats among the electoral districts is obtained by dividing the number of inhabitants of the country – given by the latest general census of the population – by a factor of 392 (also changed by the new law from the previous factor of 618) and distributing the seats in proportion to the population in each electoral district, on the basis of whole shares and the highest remainders. The number of seats assigned to the overseas constituencies forms an exception to this rule.

The new law would also amend Article 57 of the Constitution by reducing the number of senators from 315, six of which are elected in the overseas constituencies, to 200, with four to be elected in the overseas constituencies. The senators are elected on a regional basis and no region or autonomous province would have fewer than 3 (down from 7) senators, with the exception of Molise and Aosta Valley, which will respectively have two and one senators. Paragraph 4 would also be changed, to state that the subdivision of seats among the regions and autonomous provinces – in accordance with the provisions of the preceding paragraph – is made in proportion to their population given by the latest general census of the population, on the basis of whole shares and the highest remainders.

Article 59 of the Constitution would be changed by limiting the total number of incumbent life senators who can be appointed by the President of Italy to five. Previously, the provision governing the number of life senators was ambiguous, and had been interpreted as allowing each president to appoint five each, cumulating to a total above five.

The changes to Articles 56 and 57 would take effect after either the end of the current legislature, or at the next dissolution of Parliament, and not earlier than 60 days after the promulgation of the constitutional law.

Campaign positions

The proposed changes to the constitution would reduce the number of seats per electoral district for both chambers of Parliament and thus increase the number of votes required to win a seat. Consequently, they were opposed by most minor parties, with the exception of those who could count on a small but solid electoral base, such as the regional South Tyrolean People's Party, which would see their influence in Parliament increase.

Committees

Political parties

Opinion polls

Results 

The referendum resulted in a victory of the "Yes" with a majority of 70.0% of the vote. The voter turnout was 51.12%. The "Yes" was the winning choice by a large margin in all Italian regions. As a result, the next Italian legislature will have 400 members of the Chamber of Deputies and 200 Senators, and a maximum of five appointed senators for life, plus the former presidents of Italy.

Luigi Di Maio, foreign minister and former leader of the M5S, defined the results "a historical result". The secretary of the PD, Nicola Zingaretti, said that "the victory of the 'Yes' opens up a season of reforms". Riccardo Molinari, party leader of the League in the Chamber of Deputies, asked for the parliament to be dissolved and new elections to be held, in order to fulfill the objective of the constitutional law.

Results by region 
The "Yes" side was in the majority in every region and in all four overseas constituencies. Support was lowest in Friuli Venezia Giulia, with 59.57% in favor. Molise was the region with the highest support, at 79.89%, though two of the overseas constituencies had higher support.

Turnout

References 

Constitutional referendum
Italy
Constitutional referendums in Italy
Constitutional referendum
Italian constitutional referendum 2020